Clam Harbour is a rural community on the Eastern Shore region of the Halifax Regional Municipality Nova Scotia, Canada on the West Ship Harbour Road off of Trunk 7  east of Dartmouth. The community is host to the Clam Harbour Beach sandcastle contest every year in August.

Parks
Clam Harbour Beach Provincial Park

Communications
Telephone exchange 902 - 845
Postal code - B0J 1Y0

Navigator

External links
 Clam Harbour Provincial Park Interpretive Centre
Explore HRM

Communities in Halifax, Nova Scotia
General Service Areas in Nova Scotia